The Andanis River, also known as the Ananis and Anamis, was a river known to Ancient Greece.

Location
It was a river of Carmania mentioned by Ptolemy and Pliny, who called it the Ananis, and Arrian, who called it the Anamis. It was located along the coast of Hormouz around latitude 27.5N and longitude 57.5E and has been tentatively identified with the Mināb river.

History
The river was mentioned by Ptolemy, and Nearchus, being visited by the army of Alexander the Great. It was located near the Island of Ormuz.

References

Rivers of Iran
Minab County
Asian archaeology
History of the Middle East
Landforms of Hormozgan Province